Dickinson Hill Fire Tower is a historic fire observation station located at Grafton, Rensselaer County, New York. The , steel frame lookout tower is a prefabricated structure built by the Aermotor Corporation in 1924. Also on the property are the contributing concrete water tank and foundation of the observer's cabin.  It has not been staffed since 1972, and is the last remaining fire tower in Rensselaer County.

It was listed on the National Register of Historic Places in 2011.

References

Fire lookout towers on the National Register of Historic Places in New York (state)
Government buildings on the National Register of Historic Places in New York (state)
Government buildings completed in 1924
Buildings and structures in Rensselaer County, New York
National Register of Historic Places in Rensselaer County, New York
1924 establishments in New York (state)